The 2020 Latvian Higher League , known as the Optibet Virslīga for sponsorship reasons, was the 29th season of top-tier football in Latvia. The season began on 15 June 2020 and ended on 29 November 2020. The league winners earned a place in the UEFA Champions League and the second and third-placed clubs earned a place in the new UEFA Europa Conference League.

Riga were the defending champions after winning the league the previous season.

Teams
The nine clubs from the previous season remained in the league and Tukums joined as champions of 1.Liga.

League table

Results

Rounds 1–18

Rounds 19–27

Statistics

Top scorers

References

External links
 

Latvian Higher League seasons
1
Latvia
Latvia
Latvian Higher League